Matthew Steven Rife (born September 10, 1995) is an American comedian and actor, best known for his self-produced comedy special Only Fans (2021), and his appearance on the comedy competition series Bring the Funny.

Early life
Matt Rife was born in Columbus, Ohio, and grew up in North Lewisburg. He also lived in New Albany and Mount Vernon.

Career
As a comedian, Rife is best known for his self-produced comedy special Only Fans (2021), and his appearance on Bring the Funny in 2019, where he advanced to the Semi-Final Showcase but was eliminated in week 8.

As an actor, he is known for his guest roles on the sketch comedy and improv game show series Wild 'n Out, as Brandon Bliss on the comedy television series Brooklyn Nine-Nine, and as Logan on the sitcom television series Fresh Off the Boat. Rife is also a paranormal investigator featured on the YouTube channel "Overnight". In December 2022, Rife signed with Creative Artists Agency (CAA). In 2023, he released a self-titled special Matthew Steven Rife (2023) on Valentine's Day.

Personal life
Rife was formerly in a relationship with actress Kate Beckinsale. He currently resides in Austin, Texas

References

1995 births
Living people
American male comedians
American male television actors
People from Columbus, Ohio